{{Infobox company
| name = Ngmoco, LLC
| logo = Ngmocologo.gif
| type = Subsidiary
| defunct = October 18, 2016
| industry = Video games
| genre = 
| foundation = July 2008
| founder = Joe KeeneBob StevensonNeil YoungAlan Yu
| location = 
| location_city = San Francisco, California
| locations = 
| area_served = International
| key_people = Neil Young (CEO)
| products = RolandoRolando 2Eliminate Pro
| services = 
| revenue = 
| operating_income = 
| net_income = 
| aum = 
| assets = 
| equity = 
| owner = 
| num_employees = 26
| parent = DeNA Co., Ltd. (since 2010-10-25)
| footnotes = 
| intl = 
| location_country = United States
| homepage = www.ngmoco.com
}}

Ngmoco, LLC was an American-based publisher of video games for the iOS and Android platforms, and a subsidiary of DeNA Co., Ltd. The company was founded by former Electronic Arts executive Neil Young in July 2008. Since its founding, ngmoco has had more than seven million combined game installs. Venture capital firms Kleiner Perkins Caufield & Byers and Norwest Venture Partners, among others, have financed the company with a combined total of US$40.6 million. The company is most well known for their publishing of the Rolando game series and Eliminate Pro.

History
In June 2008, Electronic Arts Games label president Frank Gibeau announced to the media that executive Neil Young was leaving the company to form a company of his own. Young had managed Maxis, EA Los Angeles, and EA's Blueprint division. The next week, Young announced that the company, co-founded by Bob Stevenson, Alan Yu and Joe Keene, would be named "ngmoco" (short for "Next Generation Mobile Company"), and would focus on game publishing for the iPhone platform. It was also announced that the company had achieved funding from venture capitalist firm Kleiner Perkins Caufield & Byers (as part of the iFund), and that partner and former Chief Creative Officer of EA Bing Gordon had joined ngmoco's board of directors.

In October 2008, the company revealed their first three games to the public. They consisted of Topple, MazeFinger, and Rolando. In March 2009, ngmoco's games on the App Store had received over seven million installations. The company's board was joined by Tim Chang, whose investment firm Norwest Venture Partners invested $10,000,000 in ngmoco's second round of funding.

On June 15, 2009, ngmoco launched a social networking, game discovery, and multiplayer platform called the "Plus+ Network", combined with a third-party channel for independent developers. The "Plus+ Publishing group" is headed up by former Sega of America and LucasArts executive Simon Jeffery.

On November 4, 2009, ngmoco announced it had acquired iPhone and Facebook developer, Miraphonic, whose games included Epic Pet Wars and Epic Soldier Wars.

In February 2010, investors Institutional Venture Partners, and existing shareholders Kleiner Perkins, Norwest Venture Partners, and Maples Investments led another fund-raising campaign in a series C venture round to raise an additional $25,000,000. Soon thereafter, ngmoco acquired long-time Mac OS and iOS developer Freeverse. They also acquired Stumptown Game Machine.

On October 12, 2010, Japanese-based DeNA announced its decision to acquire ngmoco for $400,000,000. After this, ngmoco LLC became the regional headquarters for all Western subsidiaries of DeNA, including studios in Vancouver, Santiago de Chile, Stockholm and Amsterdam.

On October 18, 2016, DeNA Co., Ltd. announced the closure of all Western subsidiaries, shortly after announcing a deal a new strategy for the West in collaboration with Nintendo.

Games
The following is a list of games that have been published under the ngmoco name:Dr. Awesome (2008)MazeFinger (2008)Rolando (2008)Topple (2008)Dropship (2009)Eliminate Pro (2009)Rolando 2: Quest for the Golden Orchid (2009)Star Defense (2009)Topple 2 (2009)Touch Pets: Dogs (2009)Word-Fu (2009)Adventure Bay (2010)Charadium (2010)Eliminate Burst (2010)Eliminate: Gun Range (2010)GodFinger (2010)Star Wars: Imperial Academy (2010)Touch Pets: Cats (2010)Touch Pets: Dogs 2 (2010)We City (2010)We Doodle (2010)We Farm (2010)We Rule (2010)Fantastic Fish (2011)Dreamtopia (2012)Skyfall'' (2013)

References

External links
Official website

 
DeNA
Defunct video game companies of the United States
Video game companies established in 2008
Video game companies disestablished in 2016
Video game development companies
Video game publishers
Companies based in San Francisco